"Druk Tsenden" ("The Thunder Dragon Kingdom") is the national anthem of Bhutan. Adopted in 1953, the lyrics were written by Dolop Droep Namgay and possibly translated into English by Dasho Gyaldun Thinley. The accompanying music was composed by Aku Tongmi.

History
Despite claims made in Brozović's Enciklopedija (1999) and many subsequent authors, who attribute the authorship of the national anthem to Gyaldun Thinley, father of the former Prime Minister Jigme Thinley, there are many who believe that the words and the national anthem itself were penned by Dorji Lopen Dolop Droep Namgay of Talo, Punakha. The Dorji Lopen is the most senior of the four senior Lopens in Bhutan's religious establishment, and often serves as the Deputy Je Khenpo. Dolop Droep Namgay maintained close personal and working relations with the third King of Bhutan, Jigme Dorji Wangchuck, during whose reign Gyaldun Thinley served in various capacities.

It is possible that Gyaldun Thinley may have been involved in working closely with Dolop Droep Namgay as well as translating the lyrics into English. It is also highly likely that he (and/or his son Jigme Thinley who served in many important government and political capacities since the 1990s) was one of the persons of first contact for Dalibor Brozović who attributed Gyaldun Thinley as the author of the lyrics; however, many regard Dolop Droep Namgay as the author.

Aku Tongmi was educated in India and had recently been appointed leader of the military brass band when the need for an anthem rose at the occasion of a state visit from the Indian Prime Minister Jawaharlal Nehru. His original score was inspired by the Bhutanese folk tune "The Unchanging Lotus Throne". The melody has twice undergone changes by Tongmi's successors as band leaders. The original lyrics were 12 lines, but were shortened to the present six-line version in 1964 by a secretary to the king.

As the anthem is inspired by a folk tune, there is a choreography to it as well, originally directed by Tongmi.

Lyrics
The lyrics to the national anthem are inscribed in the Constitution of Bhutan.

See also
Flag of Bhutan
Emblem of Bhutan
National symbols of Bhutan

Notes

References

Further reading

External links
Druk tsendhen - Audio of the national anthem of Bhutan, with information and lyrics
National anthems.net midi file
Dookola Swiata - This travel website has an instrumental version of the Anthem, as an .asx file.
Children sing the anthem - This website has a sound file of Bhutanese children singing the Anthem without musical accompaniment.
Dragon King of Bhutan calls-on President of the Republic of India on the eve of 63rd Republic Day - The anthem starts at 01:30. Rendition by Rashtrapati AngRakshak.

Asian anthems
Bhutanese music
National symbols of Bhutan
National anthem compositions in E major
Royal anthems